This article documents all major events in the sport of darts over the course of 2015.

World Darts Federation (WDF)

January ET 
 January 3–11: 2015 BDO World Darts Championship in  Frimley Green
 Men's winner:  Scott Mitchell
 Women's winner:  Lisa Ashton
 January 14: Youth Pacific Masters in  
 Boy's winner:  Matthew Thompson
 Girl's winner:  Tori Kewish
 January 18: 2015 Quebec Open in  Sherbrooke
 Men's winner:  Dawson Murschell
 Women's winner:  Dianne Gobeil
 January 23–25: Fleetwood Memorial – Las Vegas Open in  Las Vegas
 Men's winner:  Jeff Smith
 Women's winner:  Paula Murphy
 January 23–25: Romanian Classic Darts Open in  Bucharest
 Men's winner:  Jamie Hughes
 Women's winner:  Hana Belobradkova
 January 24–25: German Gold Cup in  Bremen
 Men's winner:  Kevin Münch
 Women's winner:  Irina Armstrong
 January 30 – February 1: Dutch Open Darts in 
 Men's winner:  Martin Adams
 Women's winner:  Aileen de Graaf

February ET 
 February 6 – 8: Camellia Classic in 
 Men's winner:  Larry Butler
 Women's winner:  Stacy Pace
 February 27 – March 1: Port City Open in  
 Men's winner:  Darin Young
 Women's winner:  Robin Curry
 February 28 – March 1: Halifax Open in  Halifax
 Men's singles:  Kiley Edmunds
 Men's doubles:  Delton McDonald / Willie MacIsaac
 Women's singles:  Tammy Perry
 Women's doubles:  Donna Starrett / Linda Macleod
 Mixed doubles:  Darlene MacLeod / Adam Stella

March ET 
 March 7–8: Trakai Castle Cup in 
 Men's winner:  Russell Jenkins
 Women's winner:  Lumi Silvan
 March 12–15: Virginia Beach Classic in  Virginia Beach
 Men's winner:  Darin Young
 Women's winner:  Trish Grzesik
 March 14–15: West Coast Classic in 
 Men's winner:  Justin Miles
 Women's winner:  Pam Burr
 March 14–15: Greater Vancouver Open in  Vancouver
 Men's winner:  Dawson Murschell
 Women's winner:  Ivy Wieshlow
 March 14–15: Winmau Iceland Open in  Reykjavik
 Men's winner:  Barry Zander
 Women's winner:  Elínborg Björnsdóttir
 March 14: Kronenbourg 1664 Gibraltar Open in 
 Men's winner:  John Ferrell
 Women's winner:  Susanna Young
 March 20–22: Berwick Youth Easter Darts in  Berwick-upon-Tweed
 Boy's winner:  Callan Rydz
 Girl's winner:  Rebecca Graham
 March 21: HAL Masters in 
 Men's winner:  Roger Janssen
 Women's winner:  Deta Hedman
 March 22: Youth Novgorod Cup in  Veliky Novgorod
 Boy's winner:  Mikhail Kuritcin
 Girl's winner:  Inna Ramonova
 March 22: HAL Open Darts in 
 Men's winner:  Martin Adams
 Women's winner:  Aileen de Graaf

April ET 
 April 3 – 5: Darts Victoria Easter Classic in  
 Men's winner:  Robbie King 
 Women's winner:  Corrine Hammond
 Youth winner:  Tori Kewish
 April 4: Riga Open in  Riga
 Men's winner:  Darius Labanauskas
 Women's winner:  Kaisu Rekinen
 Youth winner:  Ugnius Jankunas
 April 5: Moscow Open Youth in  Moscow
 Boy's winner:  Mikhail Kuritcin
 Girl's winner:  Elena Golyasheva
 April 10 – 12: Mediterranean Open in  Antalya
 Men's winner:  Ümit Uygunsözlü
 Women's winner:  Şennur Yaşlı
 Boy's winner:  Mertcan Türkyilmaz
 Girl's winner:  Olga Abromova
 April 10 – 12: White Mountain Shootout in 
 Men's winner:  Tom Sawyer
 April 11: Silver Cup Challenge in  Medicine Hat
 Boy's winner:  Dawson Murschell
 Girl's winner:  Clover Arndt
 April 18: Bull's German Open in  
 Men's winner:  Wesley Harms
 Women's winner:  Deta Hedman
 April 19: Bull's Darts Masters in 
 Men's winner:  Jeffrey de Graaf
 Women's winner:  Lorraine Winstanley
 Boy's winner:  Callum Rydz
 Girl's winner:  Sofia Jan Bendorff
 April 24 – 26: Estonia Open in  Tallinn
 Men's winner:  Darius Labanauskas
 Women's winner:  Maret Liiri
 April 26: North Island Masters Singles in 
 Men's winner:  Cody Harris
 Women's winner:  Tina Osborne

May ET 
 May 1 – 3: Cleveland Extravaganza in 
 Men's winner:  Marlise Kiel
 Women's winner:  Trish Grzesik
 May 2: Zakamsk Youth Cup in  Perm
 Boy's winner:  Sergei Goncharov
 Girl's winner:  Anastasia Kliucek
 May 2: Denmark Open in 
 Men's winner:  Glen Durrant
 Women's winner:  Aileen de Graaf
 Boy's winner:  Andreas Bergø
 Girl's winner:  Kyana Frauenfelder
 May 3: Udmurtia Youth Cup in  Izhevsk
 Boy's winner:  Mikhail Kuirtcin
 Girl's winner:  Anastasia Suvorova
 May 3: Denmark Masters in 
 Men's winner:  Jeffrey de Graaf
 Women's winner:  Fallon Sherrock
 Boy's winner:  Maikel Verberk
 Girl's winner:  Sofie Jahn Bendorff 
 May 8 – 10: Hungarian Open in  Győr
 Men's winner:  Aaron Hardy
 Women's winner:  Veronika Ihász
 Boy's winner:  György Vörösházi
 Girl's winner:  Vivien Czipó
 May 9: Target Finnish Open in 
 Men's winner:  Daniel Larsson
 Women's winner:  Lumi Silvan
 May 10: Target Finnish Masters in 
 Men's winner:  James Hurrell
 Women's winner:  Kaisu Rekinen
 May 13 – 16: Mediterranean Cup (Invitation) in  Jesolo
 Overall winner: 
 May 15 – 17: Uganda International Darts Open in  Kampala
 May 16: Bull's Trophy Gelsenkirchen in 
 Men's winner:  Ryan de Vreede
 Women's winner:  Aileen de Graaf
 May 16 – 17: Lithuania Open in 
 Men's winner:  Darius Labanauskas
 Women's winner:  Amanda Abbot
 May 17: Bull's Classics Gelsenkirchen in 
 Men's winner:  Fabian Roosenbrand
 Women's winner:  Irina Armstrong
 May 17: Italy Med Cup Open in  Jesolo
 Men's winner:  Mer Cabril Allarce
 Women's winner:  Şennur Yaşlı
 May 23: Winmau Polish Open in 
 Girl's winner:  Sofie Bendorff
 Boy's winner:  Javanico Jansen
 Men's winner:  Darius Labanauskas
 Women's winner:  Deta Hedman
 May 23 – 24: Sunshine State Classic in  Brisbane
 Men's winner:  Nathan Paice
 Women's winner:  Corrine Hammond
 Boy's winner:  Braidon Charlton
 Women's winner:  Candice Whitley
 May 24: Police Masters in  
 Girl's winner:  Sofie Bendorff
 Boy's winner:  Javanico Jansen
 Men's winner:  Martin Phillips
 Women's winner:  Deta Hedman
 May 30: SA Youth Singles in  Ridleyton
 May 31: Canterbury Open in 
 Men's winner:  Craig Caldwell
 Women's winner:  Carol Williams

June ET 
 June 5–7: SDA Swiss Open in  Lausen
 Men's winner:  Dave Prins
 Women's winner:  Ann-Louise Peters
 Boy's winner:  Maikel Verberk
 June 5–7: BDO International Open in 
 Men's winner:  Martin Atkins
 Women's winner:  Deta Hedman
 June 13: Scottish Classic in 
 Men's winner:  Steve Ritchie
 Women's winner:  Deta Hedman
 June 13: PUMA NZ Masters in 
 June 20: Canadian Open in  St. Catharines
 Men's winner:  Rory Orvis
 Women's winner:  Cindy Hayhurst
 June 27–28: Central Coast Classic in 
 Men's winner:  Raymond Smith
 Women's winner:  Corrine Hammond
 June 27–28: Austrian Open Vienna in  Vienna
 Men's winner:  Danny Blom
 Women's winner:  Veronika Ihász
 Boy's winner:  Rusty-Jake Rodriguez
 Girl's winner:  Vivien Czipó

July ET 
 July 3–5: Australian Grand Masters in  Canberra
 July 5: Apatin Open in 
 Men's winner:  Boris Krčmar
 Women's winner:  Veronika Ihász
 July 8–11: WDF Europe Cup Youth in  Bredsten
  and  share the Boys overall Championship.
  take the Girls title.
 July 12: Japan Open in 
 Men's winner:  Seigo Asada
 Women's winner:  Fallon Sherrock
 Youth winner:  Kakeru Saito
 July 26: Pacific Masters in  Perth
 Men's winner:  Peter Machin
 Women's winner:  Lorraine Burn
 July 31 – August 2: Winmau Belgium Open in 
 Men's winner:  Jeffrey de Graaf
 Women's winner:  Fallon Sherrock
 Men's Youth winner:  Maarten Dirk Woord
 Women's Youth winner:  Kyana Frauenfelder

August ET 
 August 5: PUMA NZ Open in 
 Men's winner:  Cody Harris
 Women's winner:  Tina Osborne
 August 7–9: USA Classic in 
 Men's winner:  Larry Butler
 Men's Winner:  Marlise Kiel
 Boy's winner:  Dominik Pundt
 Girl's winner:  Kerena Reese
 August 14–16: Antwerp Open in 
 Men's winner:  Jim Williams
 Women's winner:  Deta Hedman
 Youth winner:  Job ten Heuvel
 Women's Youth winner:  Kyana Frauenfelder
 August 21–23: Swedish Open in 
 Men's winner:  Jamie Hughes
 Women's winner:  Casey Gallagher
 Boys Youth winner:  Kevin Lundeström
 Girls Youth winner:  Samantha Krop
 August 21: LDO Swedish Classic in 
 Winner:  Casey Gallagher
 August 29–30: International French Open in 
 Men's winner:  Dean Reynolds
 Women's winner:  Fallon Sherrock
 Youth winner:  Levy Frauenfelder

September ET 
 September 11–13: Winmau Bulgaria Open in  Sofia
 Men's winner:  Kostas Pantelidis
 Women's winner:  Anelia Eneva
 September 11–13: Baltic Cup Open in 
 Men's winner:  John Imrie
 Women's winner:  Sarmīte Lavrentjeva
 September 12: Catalonia Open in 
 Men's winner:  Carles Arola
 Women's winner:  Sharon Prins
 September 13: FCD Anniversary Open in 
 Men's winner:  Kevin Simm
 Women's winner:  Sharon Prins
 September 18: Auckland Open in 
 Men's winner:  Craig Caldwell
 Women's winner:  Sha Hohipa
 September 25–27: Luxembourg Winmau Open in 
 Men's winner:  Thomas Junghans
 Women's winner:  Deta Hedman
 Youth winner:  Geert Nentjes
 September 26–27: North QLD Classic in  Townsville
 Men's winner:  Raymond Smith 
 Women's winner:  Natalie Carter

October ET 
 October 2–4: Malaysian Open in  Kuala Lumpur
 October 6–11: BDO Winmau World Masters (Invitation) + (World Pro Play-Offs, Invitation) in 
 Men's winner:  Glen Durrant
 Women's winner:  Aileen de Graaf
 Boy's winner:  Justin van Tergouw
 Girl's winner:  Danielle Ashton
 October 9: Klondike Open in  Edmonton
 Men's winner:  Ken MacNeil
 Women's winner:  Kim Bellay-Rousselle
 October 16–18: Witch City Open in 
 Men's winner:  Jeff Smith
 Women's winner:  Robin Curry
 October 17–18: Australian Geelong Masters in 
 October 17–18: Hong Kong Open in 
 October 21–25: Turkish Open in 
 Men's winner:  Jim Williams
 Women's winner:  Deta Hedman
 October 23–25: Colorado Open in 
 Men's winner:  Timmy Nicoll
 Women's winner:  Marlise Kiel
 October 23–25: Bob Jones Memorial in  Trenton
 Men's winner:  David Cameron
 Women's winner:  Roxanne Van Tassel
 October 25: Next Talent of Darts in 
  Geert Nentjes, Cassandra Hof and Owen Roelofs
 October 26–31: WDF World Cup (Invitation) in 
 Men's winner:  Jim Williams
 Women's winner:  Lisa Ashton
 Men's Youth winner:  Maikel Verberk
 Women's Youth winner:  Tayla Carolissen
 October 30 – November 1: Ghost On The Coast in 
 Men's winner:  Danny Pace
 Women's winner:  Stacey Pace

November ET 
 November 6–8: Northern Ireland Open in 
 Men's winner:  Colin McGarry
 Women's winner:  Deta Hedman
 Boy's winner:  Nathan Rafferty
 Girl's winner:  Jamie O'Connor
 November 10–12: Malta Open in  Buġibba
 Men's winner:  Ümit Uygunsözlü
 Women's winner:  Ann-Kathrin Wigmann
 November 13–15: Latvia Open in  Riga
 Men's winner:  Ulf Ceder
 Women's winner:  Maud Jansson
 Youth winner:  Rihards Slišāns
 November 13–15: Seacoast Open in 
 Men's winner:  Larry Butler
 Women's winner:  Robin Curry
 November 15: Ted Clements Memorial (Levin Open) in 
 Men's winner:  Craig Caldwell
 Women's winner:  Judy Fenton
 November 20–22: Sunparks Masters in 
 Men's winner:  Yordi Meeuwisse
 Women's winner:  Anastasia Dobromyslova
 Youth winner:  Justin van Tergouw
 Women's Youth winner:  Kyana Frauenfelder
 November 20–22: Czech Open in 
 Men's winner:  Jeffrey Sparidaans
 Women's winner:  Aileen de Graaf
 Youth winner:  Wessel Nijman
 Women's Youth winner:  Vivien Czipó
 November 21 & 22: Italian Grand Master in 
 Men's winner:  Norbert Attard
 Women's winner:  Giada Ciofi

December ET 
 December 5–7: Finder Darts Masters in 
 December 6: Youth Ural Cup in  Yekaterinburg

References